Catriona maua is a species of sea slug, an aeolid nudibranch, a marine gastropod mollusk in the family Trinchesiidae.

Distribution
This species was described from  Virginia Key, Miami, United States.

References

Trinchesiidae
Gastropods described in 1960